Colin N'kee (born 14 January 1991 in Oslo) is a Norwegian footballer of Congolese descent.

References

External links 
 Profile on altomfotball 

1991 births
Living people
Footballers from Oslo
Norwegian people of Democratic Republic of the Congo descent
Norwegian footballers
Lillestrøm SK players
Strømsgodset Toppfotball players
Strømmen IF players
Eliteserien players
Norwegian First Division players
Kjelsås Fotball players
Association football forwards